Grzegorz Kossakowski (born 5 February 1991) is a Polish bobsledder. He competed in the four-man event at the 2018 Winter Olympics.

References

1991 births
Living people
Polish male bobsledders
Olympic bobsledders of Poland
Bobsledders at the 2018 Winter Olympics
Sportspeople from Białystok
Podlasie Białystok athletes
Grzegorz